Aidon Oy is a  Finnish technology company that focuses on energy metering systems. Its product portfolio covers remote energy metering systems and smart grid applications which the company sells mainly to Nordic distribution system operators. The company's homebase and headquarters is in Jyväskylä and it has offices also in Vantaa in Finland, Solna in Sweden and Asker in Norway as well as a logistics center in Vantaa.

History

Seven electrical engineers founded Aidon in Jyväskylä in 2004. They had got to know each other while working at a Jyväskylä based meter manufacturer Enermet (nowadays Landis+Gyr). Remotely read meters were becoming more common and the founders anticipated that the energy infrastructure would undergo a major change. They prepared a 30-page plan with help of which their new startup got funding of 4.8 million euros.

The company started their product development by visiting electricity distribution companies and asking about their needs involving energy metering. The first remotely read electricity meters had come to market already in the 1990s. They were traditional meters which reading was transformed to digital. Aidon was the first company who integrated functionalities for electricity grid management into a meter which was changing the market.

At first the founders’ former colleagues were hired to the company. At the end of the decade, when Nokia closed down its office in Jyväskylä, new competent resources were gained from there. ”Then we had a stroke of luck. Someone invented smart grid and it ignited buzz”, CEO Timo Chrons described the company's next steps later on. The leading position in the Nordics was achieved because the Finnish customers had been suitably demanding which helped the company to boost its competitiveness.

In year 2010 Aidon employed 30-40 people.

In 2013 a Swedish investor Alder joined as an owner.

In 2015 the company's turn-over was 20 million euros. By the beginning of 2016 Aidon had made contracts for more than 2.5 million metering points in the Nordic countries. Between 2014 and 2017 the company's turn-over grew almost tenfold (90 million euros in 2017).

In May 2019 Aidon acquired Mitello business from Polarmit Oy. Mitello focuses on metering operations and grid maintenance support.

Customers

By spring 2018 the company had delivered 2.6 million energy metering devices to Nordic countries. The company is market leader in Finland and in Norway. An EU directive requires the energy meters to be remotely read and different EU countries are applying the requirement at their own pace, with Swedish and Finnish Distribution System Operators among the first ones. In many other countries the change is just in the beginning: according to Aidon, hundreds of millions of energy meters will be changed within the coming years. In 2017 more than two thirds of the company's turn-over came from Norway.

Products

Aidon was the first company in the world to equip energy meters with sensors to detect events in the electricity grid. Its energy meters are called energy service devices. They can be remotely updated and various applications can be downloaded to them. The devices are integrated with Distribution System Operators’ information systems to register information for example about faults and load in low-voltage network. Aidon also helps to analyse the data collected from the electricity grid. With help of the products the operators can now for the first time see if their customers are getting electricity or not.

The electronics of Aidon devices are manufactured in China, Latvia and Lithuania. Their software is developed in Jyväskylä and the customisation for different customers is done in Vantaa.

Recognitions

In 2016 the city of Jyväskylä gave Aidon "Alvari honorable award" for the development work it had done for building strong competences in smart system development and provisioning in Jyväskylä region.
In 2018 Aidon was in a third place in Kauppalehti newspaper's ranking of growth companies in an area consisting of Central Finland, South Karelia, North Karelia, Southern Savonia and Northern Savonia. The companies on the ranking list had been operational at least for four years and their turnover over needed to be more than 1.7 million euros in the previous accounting period and it needed to be higher than the previous turnover had been.
In September 2018 Tekniikka&Talous newspaper selected Aidon as the Finnish Technology Growth company of the year. The jury appreciated the company's capability to develop a technologically advanced and internationally competitive product.

References

Technology companies of Finland
Jyväskylä